This is an incomplete list of seasons competed by the University of Saskatchewan Huskies football team, a team that competes in Canadian Interuniversity Sport. The sports team was established in 1912, however they did not join the Western Intercollegiate Rugby Football Union until it was founded in 1927. Throughout their history, the Huskies have won 3 Vanier Cups.

Legend:F = Points for, A = Points against

1974* - The Hardy Trophy was awarded to the regular season champion this season. As a result, the regular season champion advanced to the Churchill Bowl.

References

 Saskatchewan Huskies Media Guide